Sam, SAM or variants may refer to:

Places
 Sam, Benin
 Sam, Boulkiemdé, Burkina Faso
 Sam, Bourzanga, Burkina Faso
 Sam, Kongoussi, Burkina Faso
 Sam, Iran
 Sam, Teton County, Idaho, United States, a populated place

People and fictional characters
 Sam (given name), a list of people and fictional characters with the given name or nickname
 Sam (surname), a list of people with the surname
 Cen (surname) (岑), romanized "Sam" in Cantonese
 Shen (surname) (沈), often romanized "Sam" in Cantonese and other languages

Religious or legendary figures
 Sam (Book of Mormon), elder brother of Nephi 
 Sām, a Persian mythical folk hero
 Sam Ziwa, an uthra (angel or celestial being) in Mandaeism

Animals
 Sam (army dog) (died 2000)
 Sam (horse) (b 1815), British Thoroughbred
 Sam (koala) (died 2009), rescued after 2009 bush fires in Victoria, Australia
 Sam (orangutan), in the movie Dunston Checks In
 Sam (ugly dog) (1990–2005), voted the world's ugliest dog in 2003, 2004, and 2005
 Unsinkable Sam (died 1955), a cat which survived the sinking of three ships during World War II

Arts and entertainment

 Sam (1967 film), a 1976 film directed by Larry Buchanan
 Sam (1986 film), a 1986 documentary film
 Sam (2021 film), a 2021 film directed by Yan England
 Sam (Osvajači album), 1995
 Sam (Škabo album), 2003
 "Sam" (Olivia Newton-John song), 1977
 Sam (1973 TV series), a British drama
 Sam (1978 TV series), a US crime drama
 S.A.M. (comics), a French comic book
 Sam (Goodman novel), a 2023 novel by Allegra Goodman
 SAM Awards, for South Australian Music Awards

Business

Brands and enterprises
 SAM (vehicles), a Greek truck manufacturer
 S.A.M.: Simply About Music, a satellite-driven radio network
 SAM, stock ticker of Boston Beer Company, the brewers of Samuel Adams beer
 SAM Colombia, a Colombian airline
 SAM Records, an American disco/post-disco record company
 Società Aerea Mediterranea, an Italian airline 1926-1934 and 1959-1981

Business terminology
 Serviceable available market
 Shared appreciation mortgage
 Social accounting matrix of transactions in an economy
 System for Award Management (SAM), U.S. Government supplier database

Languages
 Sam languages, comprising Somali, Rendille and Boni
 Sam language of New Guinea

Museums
 Seattle Art Museum
 Singapore Art Museum
 SAM, museum code for the South Australian Museum

Organizations
 Sahabat Alam Malaysia, an environmental NGO based in Malaysia
 Scientific Advice Mechanism of the European Commission
 Serve America Movement, an American political party
 Snowmobile Association of Massachusetts
 Society of American Magicians

Science and technology

Biology, chemistry and medicine
 Phytelephas seemannii, known in Cuna as ''
 S-Adenosyl methionine, a common co-substrate involved in methyl group transfers
 SAM, a candidate phylum of bacteria
 Sustained Acoustic Medicine, a medical treatment for arthritis
 SAMtools (for Sequence Alignment Map), a data storage format for DNA sequencing 
 Self-assembled monolayer of amphiphilic molecules 
 Shoot apical meristem, a plant tissue
 Significance analysis of microarrays, in DNA microanalysis
 Spore photoproduct lyase, an enzyme
 Sorting and assembly machinery, a protein complex in the outer mitochondrial membrane
 Segmental arterial mediolysis, a medical condition affecting the arteries

Physics and astronomy
 Southern Annular Mode of southern hemisphere atmospheric variability
 Swinging Atwood's machine
 SAm, an unbarred Magellanic spiral galaxy

Software and computing
 SAM (file format) or Sequence Alignment Map, a data format used in bioinformatics
 Sam (text editor)
 SAM Coupé, an 8-bit British home computer
 Microsoft Sam, a voice for the screen reader in Windows 2000 and XP
 Self-Service Automated Machine, A Machine used by people living in Singapore to quench their postal needs
 SAM, a New Zealand chatbot that discuss politics
 SAM Lock Tool, better known as Syskey
 Sequential access memory
 Simple Anonymous Messaging, a protocol specification used in the I2P network layer
 Simulation for Automatic Machinery, two minicomputers
 Software asset management
 Software Automatic Mouth, speech synthesis program
 Synchronous Address Multiplexer, a chip in some 8-bit computers; see 
 Syriac Abbreviation Mark, a Unicode control character

Security 
 SAM card (Security Authentication Module card), holding cryptographic keys
 Secure access module
 Security Account Manager in Microsoft Windows

Other
 Scanning acoustic microscope
 Sample Analysis at Mars, on the Curiosity rover
 Scanning Auger microscope in Auger electron spectroscopy
 Scheduled Ancient Monument, commonly used name for British archaeological designation
 Small article monitor, screening for radioactive contamination
 Sparse antimagic square, in mathematics
 Stop action magnet in a pipe organ
 Surface-to-air missile, a type of missile

Sports
 Sam (mascot), 1984 Summer Olympics
 Strongside linebacker, gridiron football nickname
 Sam Maguire Cup, often known as "Sam", of the All-Ireland Senior Football Championship in gaelic football

Other uses
 Tropical Storm Sam, various storms named Sam
 Sandy Area Metro, Oregon, US
 Sam FM (disambiguation)
 Schule am Meer (S.a.M. or SaM), a former boarding school in Juist, East Frisian islands, Free State of Prussia, German Reich
 Special administrative measures, in US law
 Sam, in Indian classical music, the first count of a tala
 SAM, IATA airport code for Salamo Airport in Papua, New Guinea
 SAM, IOC and FIFA country code for American Samoa

See also
 Uncle Sam, a personification of the US government
 Samsø, earlier Samsey, literally "Sam's island"